This is a list of the governors of the province of Kabul, Afghanistan.

Governors of Kabul Province

See also
 List of Afghanistan governors

Notes

Kabul